The 1980 Oaxaca earthquake occurred on October 24 at  with a moment magnitude of 7.2 and a maximum Mercalli intensity of IX (Violent). This dip-slip shock left up to 300 dead, many injured, and about 150,000 homeless. While it was felt throughout southern Mexico and in Guatemala, damage (totaling $5 million) was focused in the Huajuapan de León region of the state of Oaxaca.

See also
List of earthquakes in 1980
List of earthquakes in Mexico

References

External links

Central Mexico Earthquake, 1980
Earthquakes in Mexico
Central Mexico
October 1980 events in Mexico
1980 disasters in Mexico